The Brisbane International established in 2009 is a professional tennis tournament played on outdoor hardcourts in Brisbane, Queensland in Australia. It is a WTA Premier tournament of the WTA Tour and was part of the ATP World Tour 250 series of the ATP World Tour until 2019, when it was dropped from the ATP Tour.

The tournament is held annually in January at the Queensland Tennis Centre just before the first Grand Slam tournament of the season, the Australian Open (part of the Australian Open Series). It is owned by Tennis Australia.

History

In 1997, the Corel WTA Tour created a new event –played on outdoor hardcourts– in Gold Coast, Queensland. The Tier III Gold Coast Classic was added to the three preexisting tournaments of Auckland, Sydney and Hobart, and became one of the two events held in the first week of the women's calendar, parallel to the men's Adelaide tournament. Various players, among which Ai Sugiyama, Justine Henin, Patty Schnyder or Venus Williams found success over the years at the low tier tune-up event for the Australian Open. The Gold Coast Classic became the Thalgo Australian Women's Hardcourts in 1998, took the sponsorship of Uncle Tobys in 2003, becoming Uncle Tobys Hardcourts, and changed names again in 2006 to Mondial Australian Women's Hardcourts.

Meanwhile, the ATP International Series Australian Hard Court Championships in Adelaide, which had evolved into the AAPT Championships in 1999, Next Generation Hardcourts in 2005, and Next Generation Adelaide International in 2006 had become one of the three stops of the calendar's first week, alongside the Qatar Open of Doha, and the Chennai Open in India.

As both the men's and the women's tour calendars were to undergo important changes from 2008 to 2009, with the WTA inaugurating its new roadmap of International and Premier tournaments, and the ATP Tour becoming the ATP World Tour, with new Masters 1000, 500 and 250 events, it was decided in 2006 to merge the Next Generation Adelaide International and the  Mondial Australian Women's Hardcourts into a larger ATP-WTA joint tournament in Brisbane, leading, similarly to the joint Medibank International Sydney, to the Australian Open. Tennis Australia chief Steve Wood commented on the shift: "One of the reasons we are doing this is that there's a rise of more lucrative overseas tournaments in the lead-up to the Australian Open offering increasingly attractive alternatives to the top players looking to prepare for the first Grand Slam. [...] So we really wanted them to invest in having them continue to prepare here in Australia, on the road to the Australian Open." The first Brisbane International took place in Brisbane's newly built Tennyson Tennis Centre – and its Patrick Rafter-named Centre Court – in January 2009. In time for the 2012 event the tournament was promoted to a premier event on the WTA tour.

Following the 2019 edition, the tournament was no longer recognised as an ATP event, due to the creation of the ATP Cup (played at the same venue). The tournament continued as WTA-sanctioned event for female tennis players.

Following the Covid-19 pandemic which saw the WTA Premier Event move to Adelaide for the 2021 and 2022 season, along with the departure of the ATP Cup to Melbourne in 2021 and Sydney in 2022, there is growing speculation that neither event will return in 2023. It's likely that both will be replaced by the ATP and WTA 250 events that were held as part of the Melbourne Summer set in 2022.

Past finals
In the men's singles Andy Murray (2012–13) holds the record for most titles with two and Murray concurrently holds the record for most consecutive titles. In the women's singles, Karolína Plíšková (2017,2019–20) owns the record for most titles with three.

Women's singles

Men's singles

Women's doubles

Men's doubles

See also

 Australian Hard Court Championships – men's and women's tournament in various locations (1938–2008)
 South Australian Championships – men's tournament in Adelaide (1889–1989)
 Danone Australian Hardcourt Championships – women's tournament in Brisbane (1987–1994)

References

External links

Official website
ATP World Tour tournament profile
WTA Tennis tournament profile

 
ATP Tour 250
WTA Tour
Hard court tennis tournaments
Sport in Brisbane
Tennis tournaments in Australia
Recurring sporting events established in 2009
2009 establishments in Australia
Annual sporting events in Australia
Tennis in Queensland